Kapang railway halt is a railway halt in Thailand located in Tambon Khlong Pang, Amphoe Ratsada, northeast Trang province. It is one of the railway halts of the Southern Line and is located 776.33 km (482.39 mi) from Thon Buri railway station.

Kapang initially opened as a railway station, however it was abandoned between 1981-2008, because it was burned down by Communist terrorists and was no longer usable. In August 2008, 5,000 people signed up for the government to resume train operations.

References 

Railway stations in Thailand
Trang province
Railway stations closed in 1981